Statistics of Belgian First Division in the 1978–79 season.

Overview

It was contested by 18 teams, and K.S.K. Beveren won the championship for the first time in club history.

League standings

Results

References

Belgian Pro League seasons
Belgian
1978–79 in Belgian football